Bergh, de Bergh, van den Bergh, or variant, may refer to:
 Bergh (surname)
 Van Den Bergh (surname)
 Van den Bergh catalogue, the VdB catalogue of reflection nebulae
 Gillis Gillisz. de Bergh, 17th century Dutch painter
 List of counts van Bergh
 Van Bergh countdom
 Bergh, former municipality in the Dutch province of Gelderland.
 Bergh Apton, village in England
 Bergh–Stoutenburgh House, in Hyde Park, New York, USA
 6512 de Bergh (1987 SR1), the de Bergh asteroid or Bergh asteroid

See also 
 Berg (disambiguation)
 Burg (disambiguation)
 Borg (disambiguation)
 Burgh (disambiguation)
 Borgh (disambiguation)
 Bourg (disambiguation)